is a Japanese electrical engineer. From 1976 to 1984, he served as the first president of the Toyohashi University of Technology.

His son Yoshiyuki Sakaki currently serves as the sixth president of TUT.

References

Japanese electrical engineers
Living people
Toyohashi University of Technology people
Year of birth missing (living people)